Sofya Vyacheslavovna Fyodorova (alternatively romanized as Fedorova) (born 4 September 1998) is a Russian snowboarder.

Biography
Sofya was born in Moscow. She began snowboarding at age 13.

In the 2013–14 season she took second place in the Russian Championship in slopestyle and third place in the halfpipe. In the 2014-15 season she won the national championships and the Russia Student Games, both in halfpipe. In the 2015–16 season she won three European Cups in slopestyle. In 2015, she won the Junior World Championship in big air.  In 2018 she won the overall World Cup in slopestyle. 

Fyodorova is an Honored Master of Sports of Russia (2019).

World Cup Podiums

Race Podiums
  1 wins – (1 SBS)
  1 podiums – (1 SBS)

Season titles
 1 title – (1 slopestyle)

References

External links
 Софья Федорова — победительница первенства мира в биг-эйре

1998 births
Living people
Sportspeople from Moscow
Russian female snowboarders
Snowboarders at the 2018 Winter Olympics
Olympic snowboarders of Russia
Snowboarders at the 2016 Winter Youth Olympics